The fluted pebblesnail, scientific name Somatogyrus hendersoni, is a species of very small freshwater snail with an operculum, an aquatic gastropod mollusk in the family Hydrobiidae. This species is endemic to Alabama in the United States.  Its natural habitat is rivers.

References

Molluscs of the United States
Somatogyrus
Gastropods described in 1909
Taxonomy articles created by Polbot